Clyde Fillmore (October 25, 1874<ref>Who Was Who on ScreenSilent Film Necrology p.170 2nd Edition by Eugene M. Vazzana c.2001</ref> – December 19, 1946), born Clyde Fogle, was an American actor of stage and screen. He is best remembered for a 1920 silent film that is now long lost, The Devil's Pass Key'' directed by Erich von Stroheim. In the sound era he played several character parts sometimes uncredited. Began in films in 1918 at 43 after stage career.

Filmography

References

External links

1874 births
1946 deaths
Male actors from Ohio
American male film actors
American male silent film actors
20th-century American male actors
People from McConnelsville, Ohio